Sceliphron coromandelicum is a species of  solitary mud dauber wasp in the family Sphecidae. The female holotype was collected in Coromandel Coast, India.

Ecology 
The females constructs mud nests which she provisions with spiders as a food source for the enclosed immatures. The spiders are generally Araneidae and in some cases terricolous Salticidae.

References 

Insects of India
Insects described in 1845
Sphecidae
Taxa named by Amédée Louis Michel le Peletier